William Hull (June 24, 1753 – November 29, 1825) was an American soldier and politician. He fought in the American Revolutionary War and was appointed as Governor of Michigan Territory (1805–13), gaining large land cessions from several American Indian tribes under the Treaty of Detroit (1807). He is most widely remembered, however, as the general in the War of 1812 who surrendered Fort Detroit to the British on August 16, 1812 following the Siege of Detroit. After the battle, he was court-martialed, convicted, and sentenced to death, but he received a pardon from President James Madison and his reputation somewhat recovered.

Early life and education
Hull was born in Derby, Connecticut on June 24, 1753. He graduated from Yale University in 1772, studied law in Litchfield, Connecticut, and joined the bar in 1775.

Career

Revolutionary War
At the outbreak of fighting in the American Revolutionary War (1775-1783), Hull joined a local militia and was quickly promoted to captain, then through the ranks to lieutenant colonel in the Continental Army. He fought in the battles of White Plains, Trenton, Princeton, Stillwater, Saratoga, Fort Stanwix, Monmouth, and Stony Point. He was recognized by commanding General George Washington and the Second Continental Congress for his service.

Hull was a friend of Nathan Hale and tried to dissuade him from the dangerous spy mission that ultimately cost him his life. Hull was largely responsible for publicizing the last words attributed to Hale, "I only regret that I have but one life to give for my country." At the conclusion of the war, Hull was admitted as an original member of The Society of the Cincinnati in the state of Massachusetts when it was established in 1783.  After the war, he moved to his wife's family estate in Newton, Massachusetts and served as a judge and state senator. He was elected captain of the Ancient and Honorable Artillery Company of Massachusetts in 1789.

Michigan Territory and War of 1812 

On March 22, 1805, President Thomas Jefferson appointed Hull as Governor of the recently created Michigan Territory and as its Indian Agent. All of the territory was in the hands of the Indians except for two enclaves around Detroit and Fort Mackinac, so Hull worked to gradually purchase Indian land for occupation by American settlers. He negotiated the Treaty of Detroit in 1807 with the Odawa, Chippewa, Wyandot, and Potawatomi tribes, which ceded most of Southeast Michigan and northwestern Ohio to the United States, to the mouth of the Maumee River where Toledo developed. These efforts to expand American settlement began to generate opposition, particularly from Shawnee leaders Tecumseh and his brother Tenskwatawa, who urged resistance to American culture and to further land cessions.

By February 1812, Congress was making plans for war with Great Britain, including an invasion of Canada, while the British were busy recruiting Indian tribes in the Michigan and Canada area. Hull was in Washington, D.C. when Secretary of War William Eustis informed him that President James Madison wished to appoint him a Brigadier General in command of the new Army of the Northwest. Hull was nearly 60 years old and had little interest in a new military commission, so Colonel Kingsbury was selected to lead the force instead. Kingsbury fell ill before taking command, however, and the offer was repeated to Hull, who accepted. His orders were to go to Ohio, whose governor had been charged by Madison with raising a 1,200-man militia that would be augmented by the 4th Infantry Regiment from Vincennes, Indiana to form the core of the army. From there, he was to march the army to Detroit where he was also to continue managing as Territorial Governor.

March to Detroit 
Hull arrived in Cincinnati on May 10, 1812 and took command of the militia at Dayton on May 25. The militia comprised three regiments who elected Duncan McArthur, Lewis Cass, and James Findlay as their commanding Colonels. They marched to Staunton and then to Urbana, Ohio where they were joined by the 300-man 4th Infantry Regiment. The men of the militia were ill-equipped and little trained, averse to strong military discipline. Hull relied on the infantry regiment to quell several instances of insubordination on the remainder of the march. By the end of June, the army had reached the rapids of the Maumee River, where he committed the first of the errors that reflected poorly on him later.

The United States declared war on Britain on June 18, 1812, and that same day Secretary Eustis sent two letters to General Hull. He sent one of them by special messenger which arrived on June 24—but it did not mention the declaration of war. The second one did announce the declaration of war, but Eustis sent it via the postal service and it did not arrive until July 2. As a result, Hull was still unaware that his army was at war when he reached the rapids of the Maumee. Taking advantage of the waterway, he sent the schooner Cuyahoga Packet ahead of the army to Detroit with a number of invalids, supplies, and official documents; but the British commander at Fort Amherstburg had received the declaration of war two days earlier, and he captured the ship as it sailed past. Thus, he gained all of Hull's military papers and plans for an attack on Fort Amherstburg.

Invasion of Canada 

Hull was partly the victim of his government's poor preparation for war and poor communication. He had repeatedly urged his superiors while he was governor to build a naval fleet on Lake Erie in order to defend Detroit, Fort Mackinac, and Fort Dearborn, but his requests were ignored by General Henry Dearborn, the commander of the northeast.

Hull began an invasion of Canada on July 12, 1812, crossing the Detroit River east of Sandwich (the area around Windsor, Ontario). He issued a proclamation to the "inhabitants of Canada" indicating that he wanted to free them from the "tyranny" of Great Britain and to give them the liberty, security, and wealth which his own country was experiencing—unless they preferred "war, slavery and destruction". It soon became apparent that he would encounter great resistance, however, and he withdrew to the American side of the river on August 7 after receiving news of a Shawnee ambush on Major Thomas Van Horne's 200 men who had been sent to support the American supply convoy; half of the troops were killed. Hull had also faced a lack of support from his officers and fear among the troops of a possible massacre by Indian forces. A group of 600 troops led by Lieutenant Colonel James Miller remained in Canada, attempting to supply the American position in the Sandwich area, with little success.

Surrender of Detroit 

Hull surrendered Fort Detroit to General Isaac Brock on August 16, 1812 because Brock had tricked him into thinking that he was vastly outnumbered by his foes. The force included 600 Indian warriors and 1,300 soldiers, as well as two warships, according to Brock's report. Hull had 2,500 soldiers under his command. The number of troops under Hull's command was estimated at between 750 and 1060 by his grandson.

Brock sent Hull a demand for surrender:
The force at my disposal authorizes me to require of you the immediate surrender of Fort Detroit. It is far from my intention to join in a war of extermination, but you must be aware, that the numerous body of Indians who have attached themselves to my troops, will be beyond control the moment the contest commences.

Hull believed that the surrender was a valid step because he was lacking adequate gunpowder and cannon balls to withstand a long siege. The move also saved his 2,500 soldiers and 700 civilians from "the horrors of an Indian massacre", as he later wrote.

In 1814, Hull was court martialed at a trial presided over by General Henry Dearborn, with future president Martin Van Buren as the special judge advocate in charge of the prosecution. Robert Lucas, the future governor of Ohio and territorial governor of Iowa, gave evidence against him. Hull was convicted of cowardice and neglect of duty and was sentenced to be shot. However, President James Madison commuted the sentence to merely dismissing him from the Army in recognition of his heroic service during the Revolutionary War.

Later life and death
Hull lived the remainder of his life in Newton, Massachusetts with his wife Sarah Fuller. He wrote Detroit: Defence of Brig. Gen. Wm. Hull in 1814 and Memoirs of the Campaign of the Northwestern Army of the United States: A.D. 1812, published in 1824 and both attempting to clear his name. Some later historians have agreed that he was unfairly made a scapegoat for the embarrassing loss of Detroit. The publication of his Memoirs in 1824 changed public opinion somewhat in his favor, and he was honored with a dinner in Boston on May 30, 1825. That June, the Marquis de Lafayette visited him and declared, "We both have suffered contumely and reproach; but our characters are vindicated; let us forgive our enemies and die in Christian love and peace with all mankind." Hull died at home in Newton several months later, on November 29, 1825.

His son Abraham was an Army captain during the War of 1812 and died at the Battle of Lundy's Lane at age 27. His remains were buried in the Drummond Hill Cemetery in Niagara Falls, Ontario, the only American officer to be buried there. Hull was also uncle to Isaac Hull, son of his brother Joseph. Joseph died while Isaac was young, so Hull adopted the boy. Isaac commanded the USS Constitution during the War of 1812.

See also
List of people pardoned or granted clemency by the president of the United States
 The Society of the Cincinnati
 The American Revolution Institute

References

Works cited 
 
 , p. 364-369

Further reading 

 
  (Google Books version contains both this document and Hull's Memoirs; the report of the trial begins at p. 240)
 
 

1753 births
1825 deaths
United States Army personnel of the War of 1812
Writers from Massachusetts
Writers from Michigan
Massachusetts state court judges
Massachusetts state senators
Military personnel from Connecticut
American people of English descent
Governors of Michigan Territory
People from Derby, Connecticut
United States Army personnel who were court-martialed
Recipients of American presidential pardons
Burials at Mount Auburn Cemetery
United States Army generals
War of 1812 prisoners of war held by the United Kingdom
People of colonial Connecticut